José Aguiar or José Aguiar García (born 1895 (Santa Clara, Cuba), died 1976 (Madrid)) was a painter and muralist from La Gomera.

Aguiar was born in Cuba in 1895 but his family returned to Agulo, La Gomera a few months later in 1896 where he was baptised. He went to school in La Laguna and studied law in Madrid for two years before moving to the Escuela de Bellas Artes de San Fernando in 1916, studying under José Pinazo Martínez.

His main residence was Madrid from 1924 onwards although he moved for a period to Florence in 1930 and had a spell as Professor of Drawing at the School of Arts and Crafts in Seville from 1933. In 1947 he set up his studio in Pozuelo de Alarcón.

As well as producing numerous paintings, he also painted murals in several religious buildings in the Canary Islands and the Spanish mainland. He was a member of the Royal Academy of Fine Arts.

His house on Calle de la Seda, Agulo, a good example of eighteenth century Canarian architecture, was purchased by the municipal council and restored at a cost of 470,000 Euro as a part of the regeneration project of the municipality of Agulo. It was turned into a museum, library, artist studio and exhibition space.

Selected works

Mujeres del sur (Women of the south) - Gold Medal, National Painting Exhibition, Barcelona, 1929
Romaria de San Juan, Cabildo of La Gomera, 1924
Frescoes in the Basilica of Candelaria, Tenerife such as El milagro de los panes y los peces (Miracle of the Loaves and the Fishes), 1962
Friso Isleño (Islander Frieze), Casino de Santa Cruz de Tenerife, 1934
Desnudo en rojo, c. 1940
Composición campo y figuras, c. 1940
Muja Canaria (Canarian woman), 1950s
Maternidad O Desnudo (Maternity or Naked), 1946
La pescadora, Collection of the City of London Corporation
Lago, c. 1950

References

People from La Gomera
20th-century Spanish painters
20th-century Cuban male artists
20th-century Spanish male artists
Spanish male painters
1895 births
1976 deaths
Spanish muralists
Cuban emigrants to Spain